Burquitlam is a neighbourhood and commercial district of the City of Coquitlam, British Columbia, Canada.

History
Its name derives from a combination of the names of the cities (then district municipalities) of Burnaby and Coquitlam in order to name a post office for this area, which is just east of the boundary of the two cities and is not used by the City of Burnaby. 

A fictionalized version of Burquitlam is seen in the 1982 film Big Meat Eater.

Geography
The Planning Department of the City of Coquitlam describes Burquitlam as being north of the golf course, east of North Road, and to the south of the boundary of the City of Port Moody.  Burquitlam Plaza is a shopping plaza by the intersection of Clarke Road (a northeastern continuation of the North Road arterial) and Como Lake Ave.

Demographics

Ethnicity

Language

Transportation
On December 2, 2016, the SkyTrain's Millennium Line Evergreen Extension opened. The area is served by Burquitlam station.

Climate
Like the rest of Metro Vancouver, Burquitlam features an oceanic climate. Snowfall is slightly higher than the City of Vancouver due to the inland location and relative high elevation of Burquitlam.

References

Neighbourhoods in Coquitlam